Paolo Mario Carlo Corallini (11 May 1911 – 29 February 1992) was a French racing cyclist. He rode in the 1935 Tour de France.

References

1911 births
1992 deaths
French male cyclists
Place of birth missing